Eric Sylvain Abidal (born 11 September 1979) is a French former professional footballer who played as a left-back or centre-back.

In his career, he played mainly for Lyon and Barcelona, winning 18 trophies with both teams combined, including two Champions League trophies with the latter. His later career was marred by a liver tumour, which resulted in a transplant.

A French international across nine years, Abidal represented the nation in two World Cups – finishing second in 2006 – and Euro 2008.

Club career

Early career
Born in Saint-Genis-Laval, Lyon Metropolis, Abidal started playing with AS Lyon Duchère, an amateur team in the suburbs. He started his professional career with AS Monaco FC, making his Ligue 1 debut on 16 September 2000 in a 3–0 home win against Toulouse FC but only appearing in 22 league matches over the course of two full seasons.

Abidal transferred to fellow top-division club Lille OSC for 2002–03, reuniting with former manager Claude Puel and being first-choice during his spell. Subsequently, he returned to his native region and joined Olympique Lyonnais.

Lyon
During his later years in France, where he won three consecutive national championships – of the seven the team won – Abidal's confidence was shown when Lyon played Manchester United and he was in charge of marking Cristiano Ronaldo: "As a defender, my aim is to infuriate the opponent," he explained. "I want him to be so sick of the sight of me that he has to move somewhere else on the pitch to get away." His defensive teammates at L'OL included François Clerc, Grégory Coupet and Anthony Réveillère, as well as Brazilian internationals Caçapa and Cris.

On 10 November 2004, Abidal scored the first goal of his career, in a 3–2 loss at former club Lille in the second round of the Coupe de la Ligue. As a result of his exploit, his parents agreed to get married after a 35-year union.

Abidal missed the first months of the 2005–06 campaign after fracturing his metatarsus in a friendly game with Once Caldas. He still managed to appear in 15 matches as Lyon won its fifth national championship in a row (the second with the player).

Barcelona

On 29 June 2007, Abidal signed a four-year contract with FC Barcelona for €9 million, after repeatedly stating that he would not return to training with Lyon if he was not allowed to move. He was given the number 22 jersey, as the number 20 he wore at Lyon was already taken by Deco; club president Joan Laporta also mentioned that his contract contained a €90 million release clause, and that Lyon would receive an extra €500,000 if Barcelona won the UEFA Champions League in any of the following four seasons.

Abidal made his La Liga debut on 26 August 2007 in a 0–0 away draw against Racing de Santander, and ended his first season with 30 games as Barça finished in third place in the league. He missed the 2009 Champions League Final against Manchester United after picking up a red card in the semi-final against Chelsea: the referee deemed Abidal to have fouled countryman Nicolas Anelka and denying a scoring opportunity, although video evidence suggested that any contact was minimal; again through suspension he also did not dress up for the decisive match of the Copa del Rey, as the team won the treble.

In 2009–10, Abidal continued to be the starter for the Pep Guardiola-led side, even after the arrival of Maxwell from Inter Milan. He scored his first goal on 5 January 2011, netting at the San Mamés Stadium in the Spanish Cup last-16 second leg (1–1 away draw, away goals rule qualification).

On 18 January 2012, Abidal scored his second goal for Barcelona, also in the domestic cup, helping the visitors come from behind to win it 2–1 at Real Madrid (eventually 4–3 on aggregate). He renewed his contract early into the following month, keeping him at the Camp Nou until 30 June 2013, but on 30 May of that year it was announced that the club would not further extend it.

Health issues
On 15 March 2011, Barcelona announced that Abidal had been diagnosed with a tumour in his liver, and the player underwent surgery two days later. Citing privacy concerns as wished by the player, the club did not release additional information in regards to his condition. In response to the announcement, players and fans around the world dedicated well wishes to him on various social networking service and sports websites.

Before their round-of-16 match in the Champions League, both Real Madrid and Lyon players took the pitch wearing Ánimo Abidal (Get Well Abidal) T-shirts, with the same message being displayed on the Santiago Bernabéu Stadium's scoreboards, in a show of support and solidarity. During Barcelona's match with Getafe CF on 19 March 2011, the fans at the stadium clapped for the entire 22nd minute (Abidal's kit number). On 28 May 2011, in the Champions League Final against Manchester United, he played the full 90 minutes of Barcelona's 3–1 triumph and, in a gesture to mark his recovery, Carles Puyol handed him his captain's armband and allowed him to be the first to lift the trophy in front of 85,000 people at Wembley Stadium in London.

On 15 March 2012, it was announced that Abidal would have to undergo a liver transplant because of problems which were unresolved with the previous operation. On 10 April he underwent surgery, with his cousin Gérard being the donor. On the same day Barcelona beat Getafe 4–0, and the victory was dedicated to the player in the post-game press conference; he later revealed that his friend and teammate Dani Alves offered to donate part of his liver for the transplant, but he declined because it would have affected the latter's playing career.

Abidal was released from hospital on 21 May 2012. He returned to training in the Pyrenees in October 2012 but, the following month, he stated that his priority was a return to full health rather than resuming his football career.

On 18 December 2012, Abidal was given the green light to start training again, and he returned to active in January of the following year. On 19 March of the following year he played 65 minutes for FC Barcelona B in a practice match with FC Istres, and on 6 April he returned to official play, replacing Gerard Piqué for the last 20 minutes of a 5–0 home win against RCD Mallorca. Two weeks later, he played the full 90 minutes for the first time since his comeback, featuring in a 1–0 home success over Levante UD.

Monaco return
On 8 July 2013, 33-year-old Abidal returned to Monaco after more than one decade, signing for one season with the option of a further one. After helping the principality team secure a place in the Champions League in his debut campaign, he agreed to a one-year contract extension.

Olympiacos
On 5 July 2014, two days after renewing his link to Monaco, Abidal signed a two-year contract with Olympiacos FC. On 19 December, however, he retired from the game for personal reasons.

Return to Barcelona
Abidal returned to Barcelona in June 2018, replacing Roberto Fernández as the club's director of football. He was sacked on 18 August 2020, following the 8–2 defeat against FC Bayern Munich in the Champions League quarter-finals.

International career
Abidal earned 67 caps for the France national team, his debut coming on 18 August 2004 in a friendly with Bosnia and Herzegovina. He was selected for the 2006 FIFA World Cup, playing all the games and minutes in the country's runner-up campaign as left-back, with the exception of the match against Togo, from which he was suspended after earning two yellow cards in the first two fixtures. In the final against Italy, he scored his penalty shootout attempt.

Again under Raymond Domenech, Abidal was first-choice during the Euro 2008 qualifying campaign. In the final stages, he appeared against Italy as a centre-back, but conceded a penalty and was sent off in the first half of an eventual 2–0 loss and group stage exit. He played against Uruguay and Mexico in the 2010 World Cup again as stopper, opting out of the next game against host country South Africa as the French side again left the competition after only three matches.

Style of play
Abidal was a tactically intelligent and versatile defender, capable of featuring as a centre or left-back due to his positional sense and his ability to read the game. In his prime, he was also quick and strong which, along with his technical ability and distribution, allowed him run up the wing to assist his team offensively as well as defensively.

Personal life
Abidal was raised in a Catholic family and converted to Islam in his 20s. He married former gymnast Hayet Kebir in 2003, fathering children Méliana, Canélia, Leyna, Kenya and Edan.

In November 2021, Hayet filed for divorce after Abidal admitted to having an affair with Paris Saint-Germain player Kheira Hamraoui.

Career statistics

Club

International

Honours

Lyon
Ligue 1: 2004–05, 2005–06, 2006–07
Trophée des Champions: 2004

Barcelona
La Liga: 2008–09, 2009–10, 2010–11, 2012–13
Copa del Rey: 2008–09, 2011–12
Supercopa de España: 2009, 2010, 2011
UEFA Champions League: 2008–09, 2010–11
UEFA Super Cup: 2009, 2011
FIFA Club World Cup: 2009, 2011

Olympiacos
Super League Greece: 2014–15

France
FIFA World Cup runner-up: 2006

Individual
Ligue 1 Team of the Year: 2005, 2006, 2007
UEFA Team of the Year: 2007
LFP Defender of the Year: 2011
FC Barcelona Player of the Season (Trofeo Aldo Rovira): 2012
Globe Soccer Awards: Player Career Award 2012
Premio internazionale Giacinto Facchetti: 2013

References

External links

1979 births
Living people
People from Saint-Genis-Laval
French people of Martiniquais descent
French former Christians
French Muslims
Converts to Islam from Roman Catholicism
Sportspeople from Lyon Metropolis
Black French sportspeople
French footballers
Footballers from Auvergne-Rhône-Alpes
Association football defenders
Ligue 1 players
AS Monaco FC players
Lille OSC players
Olympique Lyonnais players
La Liga players
FC Barcelona players
Super League Greece players
Olympiacos F.C. players
UEFA Champions League winning players
France international footballers
2006 FIFA World Cup players
2010 FIFA World Cup players
UEFA Euro 2008 players
French expatriate footballers
Expatriate footballers in Monaco
Expatriate footballers in Spain
Expatriate footballers in Greece
French expatriate sportspeople in Monaco
French expatriate sportspeople in Spain
French expatriate sportspeople in Greece
FC Barcelona non-playing staff
Liver transplant recipients